Souhila Benaicha (born 11 May 1988) is an Algerian team handball player. She plays for the club Biar, and on the Algerian national team. She represented Algeria at the 2013 World Women's Handball Championship in Serbia, where the Algerian team placed 22nd.

References

1988 births
Living people
Algerian female handball players
21st-century Algerian people